Bowman Bay may refer to:
Bowman Bay, Nunavut, Canada
Bowman Bay, Washington, United States